The 1983 Berlin Marathon was the 10th running of the annual marathon race held in Berlin, West Germany, held on 25 September. Belgium's Karel Lismont won the men's race in 2:13:37 hours, while the women's race was won by Britain's Karen Holdsworth in 2:40:32. West Germany's Gregor Golombek (1:55:10) and Gabriele Beyer (2:51:12), won the men's and women's wheelchair races. A total of 5121 runners finished the race, comprising 4886 men and 235 women.

Results

Men

Women

References 

 Results. Association of Road Racing Statisticians. Retrieved 2020-06-20.
 Berlin Marathon results archive. Berlin Marathon. Retrieved 2020-06-20.

External links 
 Official website

1983
Berlin Marathon
1980s in West Berlin
Berlin Marathon
Berlin Marathon